Stepanovka is a rural locality (a village) in Mikhaylovsky Selsoviet, Bizhbulyaksky District, Bashkortostan, Russia. The population was 6 as of 2010.

Geography 
It is located 55 km from Bizhbulyak and 15 km from Mikhaylovka.

References 

Rural localities in Bizhbulyaksky District